The 1930 Michigan Tech Huskies football team represented Michigan Technological University as an independent in the 1930 college football season. Led by second-year head coach  Bert Noblet, the Huskies compiled a record of 1–5.

Schedule

References

Michigan Tech
Michigan Tech Huskies football seasons
Michigan Tech Huskies football